Carlo V. Bellieni (Siena, Italy, 1962- ) is an Italian neonatologist and a bioethicist. He served as Secretary of the Bioethics Committee of the Italian Pediatrics Society. He is also a member of the ethical board of the Siena Biotech research facility, and of the Ethical Board of the Siena University Hospital, where he directs the neonatal intensive therapy unit.
He follows the empirical approach in bioethics. According to his studies, an ethical approach includes three main points: realism, reason, and empathy.
Bellieni is the author of many clinical research papers in international scientific journals, including studies on electromagnetic emission from neonatal incubators and on pain in children, and has written several books in Italian, Spanish, French, and English on neonatal pain and bioethics.

Studies on infants' pain

He created and developed a new method of nonpharmacological analgesia called "sensorial saturation", based on the simultaneous administration of gentle stimuli (touch, taste and voice) to the baby during a painful procedure, reported among the most effective for pain in babies. Bellieni also performed studies on babies' crying, developing a pain scale based on the acoustical analysis of crying.

Studies on human crying and weeping

Neonatal crying analysis: Bellieni performed several analyses on babies' crying and showed that it is not useful to detect the cause that provoked it; nonetheless, it contain a sort of protolanguage, namely the patterns of crying change dramatically when it exceeds a certain pain threshold.

Meaning of weeping: Bellieni analysed the weeping behavior and concluded that most animals can cry but only humans have psychoemotional shedding of tears, also known as “weeping”. Weeping is a behavior that induces empathy perhaps with the mediation of the mirror neurons network, and influences the mood through the release of hormones elicited by the massage effect made by the tears on the cheeks, or through the relief of the sobbing rhythm.

Laughter

Human laughter: Laughter is a form of alarm siren, that informs bystanders that a worrying event is now over.  The characteristic worrying event, according to his studies, is finding a stiff behavior in a fluid, alive one: it is this contrast that freightens us, and finding it resolved is a sudden joy that should be communicated to others. Laughter is rhythmic because it should have the features of a real alarm siren, to share this ceased alarm.

References

External links
 Italian Pediatrics Society
 Scienza e Vita
 Siena Biotech

1962 births
Living people